{{DISPLAYTITLE:C6H6N2O2}}
The molecular formula C6H6N2O2 (molar mass: 138.12 g/mol) may refer to:

 Nitroanilines
 2-Nitroaniline
 3-Nitroaniline
 4-Nitroaniline
 Urocanic acid